In journalism, jet set is a term for an international social group of wealthy people who travel the world to participate in social activities unavailable to ordinary people. The term, which replaced "café society", came from the lifestyle of travelling from one stylish or exotic place to another via jet plane.

The term "jet set" is attributed to Igor Cassini, a reporter for the New York Journal-American, who wrote under the pen name "Cholly Knickerbocker".

Jet passenger service in the 1950s was marketed primarily to the upper class, but its introduction eventually resulted in a substantial democratization of air travel. Although the term "jet set" can still be found in common parlance, its literal meaning of those who travel by jet is no longer applicable as such.

History
BOAC inaugurated the world's first commercial scheduled jet service on 2 May 1952, using the de Havilland Comet, followed by the introduction of the Comet 4 in 1958 after a series of accidents in 1953–1954. The first successful service, from October 1958, was the typical "jet set" route, London–New York City. Pan Am followed suit with the Boeing 707, making its first scheduled flight between New York City and Paris on 26 October 1958.

Other cities on the standard jet set routes were Honolulu, Mexico City, Las Vegas, Los Angeles, San Francisco, Washington, D.C., Rio de Janeiro, Athens, London, Madrid, Paris, Rome, Vienna, Bangkok, Hong Kong, and Tokyo. Jet set resorts, invariably with white sand and salt water, were circumspect by modern standards; Acapulco, Nassau with Huntington Hartford's new Paradise Island (opened in 1962) were taking the place of Bermuda. Meanwhile, Cannes, Capri, St. Tropez, Marbella, Portofino, and selected small towns on the French and Italian Riviera were on the jet set itinerary. Greek Islands such as Mykonos were included in the loop around 1974.

The original members of this elite, free-wheeling set were those "socialites" who were not shy about publicity and entertained in semi-public places like restaurants and in night clubs, where the "paparazzi"—a jet set phenomenon—photographed them. They were the first generation that might weekend in Paris or fly to Rome just for a party. The jet set was celebrated in popular culture, for example, Federico Fellini captured their lifestyle in La Dolce Vita (1960), and many record albums of the era promoted flying to foreign lands for honeymoons and getaways, such as Capitol Records Honeymoon in Rome (1956).

A sign that "jet set" had lost its glamorous edge was Vogue Magazine coinage of the term "the Beautiful People" in the spring of 1962, an expression that initially referred to the circle that formed around President John F. Kennedy and First Lady Jacqueline Kennedy. Readers of the 15 February 1964 Vogue could learn "What the beautiful people are doing to keep fit." The two phrases ran for a time in tandem; in 1970, Cleveland Amory could fear "that the Beautiful People and the Jet Set are being threatened by current economics."

A more serious economic threat was the 1973 oil crisis, which cast a pall over the idea of jetting about for pleasure. A sign that "jet set" had passed from urbane use was the 1974 country song "(We're Not) The Jet Set", in which George Jones and Tammy Wynette claim they are "the old Chevrolet set," as opposed to leading a glamorous, "jet-setting" lifestyle. Books and movies about or referencing to this class include Jacqueline Susann's Once Is Not Enough (1973 novel, 1975 film) and the 1986 teen film drama, Fire With Fire, the latter movie consisting of jet set parents who sent their daughter to a convent school and were planning to send her to a Swiss finishing school after graduation from the convent's high school, further depriving her of normal adolescent rites of passage and family contact.

The flagging "jet set" gained its second wind with the introduction in 1976 of the supersonic Concorde. Scheduled flights began on 21 January 1976 on the London–Bahrain oil executive route and the distinctly jet-set Paris–Rio de Janeiro (via Dakar) route. From November 1977 the Concorde was flying between standard jet set destinations, London or Paris to New York City; passenger lists on initial flights were gossip-column material. The Concorde restored the term's cachet: "From rock stars to royalty, the Concorde was the way to travel for the jet set," according to the Nova retrospective special "Supersonic Dream". However, the Concorde was doomed by its sonic boom, inability to achieve global fly-over rights because of the boom, its huge thirst for jet fuel, and a disastrous crash. The aircraft was retired in 2003. Meanwhile, the Boeing 747, densely packed with passengers, was craft that accelerated the social changes already brought about by the jet age.

Where English is a second language, the term has seen continued usage—in the early 1980s, the Argentinian rock band Soda Stereo recorded a successful song "¿Por qué no puedo ser del Jet Set?" ("Why can't I belong to the jet set?"), and in the French comedy Jet Set (2000) made fun of this .

See also
Celebrity culture
Elite
High society
International Debutante Ball
Jet Age
Lifestyles of the Rich and Famous
Pan Am (TV series)
Playboy
Setjetting

References

Further reading

External links

Upper class culture
History of aviation
20th century